Owzun Owbeh (also Romanized as Owzūn Owbeh and Ūzūn Owbeh; also known as Owzūn Owyeh and Ūzūn Qowbeh) is a village in Sarajuy-ye Jonubi Rural District, Saraju District, Maragheh County, East Azerbaijan Province, Iran. At the 2006 census, its population was 78, in 23 families.

References

External links

Towns and villages in Maragheh County